Czech law, often referred to as the legal order of the Czech Republic, is the system of legal rules in force in the Czech Republic, and in the international community it is a member of. Czech legal system belongs to the Germanic branch of continental legal culture (civil law). Major areas of public and private law are divided into branches, among them civil, criminal, administrative, procedural and labour law, and systematically codified.

Written law is the basis of the legal order, and the most important source of law are: legal regulations (acts of parliament, as well as delegated legislation), international treaties (once they have been ratified by the parliament and promulgated), and such findings of the Constitutional Court of the Czech Republic, in which a statute or its part has been nullified as unconstitutional. It is made public by the periodically published , abbreviated Sb. (“Collection of International Treaties”).

The system of law and justice in the Czech Republic has been in constant development since the 1989 regime change. In 1993, the Constitution of the Czech Republic has been enacted, which postulates the rule of law, outlines the structure and principles of democratic government, and declares human rights and rights of the citizen. Since 2004, the membership in the EU means the priority of  European Union law over Czech law in some areas. Recently, a brand new Criminal Code entered into force in 2010, and the Civil Code followed in 2014.

Sources of law 

Sources of Czech law are (in this hierarchical order):

 the Constitution and constitutional acts
 international treaties ratified by the Parliament
 statutes adopted by the Parliament, published decisions of the Constitutional Court
 derived legislation: government orders and notifications of ministries; legislative acts of territorial self-government bodies: regional ordinances and municipal ordinances

Acts of parliament and other legal regulations enter into force on the day they are promulgated (published) in the official Collection of Law (abbreviated as  – Coll. – when referring to statutes), although they may take effect at a later date. International treaties are similarly published in the Collection of International Treaties (abbreviated Sb. m. s.).

Constitutional law 

Czech constitution is written, and it consists of several constitutional acts (one of them the Constitution of the Czech Republic), together they are known as the constitutional order of the Czech Republic.

The constitution can be viewed as entrenched, because constitutional statutes are more difficult to adopt, amend, supplement or repeal them than ordinary laws of the country. A special majority (constitutional supermajority) is required of three-fifths of all Deputies and a qualified majority of three-fifths of all Senators present. This is to promote continuity and stability of the political system.

Most important constitutional acts are:

 Constitutional Act No. 1/1993 Coll. the Constitution of the Czech Republic
 Resolution No. 2/1993 Coll. [...] incorporating Charter of Fundamental Rights and Basic Freedoms [...]
 Constitutional Act No. 110/1998 Coll. on the Security of the Czech Republic
 Constitutional Act No. 347/1997 Coll. on the Creation of Higher Territorial Self-Governing Units

The 1992 Constitution of the Czech Republic declares sovereignty (self-government) of the people and the values of freedom and democracy. It defines the separation of the three powers in a system of Checks and balances. It gives the legislative power to the popularly elected Czech Parliament consisting of two chambers, the Chamber of Deputies and the Senate. The executive power is divided between the President and the Prime Minister. It describes the functioning of the judiciary, especially the Constitutional Court. Two more institutions are established, the Czech National Bank and the Supreme Audit Office.

The Charter of Fundamental Rights and Basic Freedoms is a bill of rights document enacted in 1991 by the Czechoslovak Federative Republic. In the Czech Republic it was kept in its entirety and forms a part of the constitutional order (i.e. has the same legal force as the Constitution). It postulates the sanctity of natural human rights and fundamental freedoms as well as citizens' (political) rights, the equality before the law, rights of minorities and so on.

The Constitution has been seriously modified in February 2012, introducing a controversial popular vote of the President of the Czech Republic:

 Constitutional Act No. 71/2012 Coll.

International treaties 

On joining the European Union, the Czech Republic committed itself to respect the principle of the supremacy of European law over Czech law in defined areas.

The most important treaty in this category is the Council of Europe’s Convention for the Protection of Human Rights and Fundamental Freedoms.

Statutes adopted by the Parliament 

Major areas of Czech law are codified in a systematic manner.

Criminal law 

Most important statutes in the criminal justice field are:

 Act No. 40/2009 Coll., the Criminal Code
 Act No. 141/1961 Coll., the Criminal Procedure Code
 Act No. 218/2003 Coll., on Juvenile Criminal Justice

Since 2010, Czech criminal law is regulated mainly, though not only, by the Criminal Code Act 2009, which codifies substantive criminal law. The comprehensive regulatory statute for criminal procedure is the Criminal Proceedings Code Act 1961. The two codes are complemented by the Juvenile Criminal Justice Act 2003, which deals with alleged offenders aged between 15 (the threshold of criminal liability as well as age of legal consent) and 17.

Until 2009, the criminal code statute in force dated back to 1961. In spite of numerous amendments made since the 1989, it still conformed to the communist ideology, oriented on punishment of perceived enemies of the socialist regime. As a part of an effort to comprehensively reform law and justice, a brand new codification has been written. The Ministry of Justice announced it as an "elaborate piece of work boiled down from the experience and knowledge of foremost expert on criminal law", which can be proudly compared to modern criminal codes of other democratic countries.

The purpose of the 2009 codification was to bring the criminal justice system in line with the rest of Europe. The main change introduced by the code was transition from material to formal conception of criminal offence. Another thing the lawyers drafting the 2009 code had in mind, and expressed it in the area of sentencing tariffs, was a new balance of punishment against rehabilitation effect on the criminal. On one hand we see the sentences for felony which carry a sentence of at least 5 years. On the other a newly created category of misdemeanour introduces a host of community sentences, including community payback or house arrest. The code also outlaws doping.

Less serious breaches of law are called contraventions. These are not normally dealt with by the courts of law, but rather punished either by the police on the spot, or through a procedure in front of a committee at the local or municipal authority, or sometimes other administration body. The result is not a conviction, and so such a punishment will not blemish the culprit's criminal record. Like with other administrative acts, the outcome of this procedure can be challenged through the administrative justice process. A typical example of contraventions in Czech law this are driving offences. (In the common law world, acts falling into this category would be classed as summary offences.)
 Act No. 200/1990 on Contraventions

Since 2012, Czech law also recognizes criminal liability of corporations for offences committed by employees of a corporation, when acting on its behalf, being instructed by the board of directors or other representative of the company, or through lack of their action. In such cases, not only individuals will be prosecuted, but the corporation can be prosecuted as well for the same offence and punished by a host of measures, starting from certain injunctions, through fines a forfeitures, to liquidation of the company.

 Act No. 418/2011 Coll., on Criminal Liability of Legal Persons and the Proceedings against Them

Civil law 

Main statutes regulating this area are:

 Act No. 89/2012 Coll. the Civil Code
 Act No. 99/1963 Coll. the Civil Procedure Code
 Act No. 500/2004 Coll. the Administrative Procedure Code

The Civil Code codifies core areas of private law. It has five parts. The first part is dedicated to a legal status of a person as an individual. The second regulates family law – e.g. the institute of marriage and the rights and obligations of husband and wife, parents and children. Although the Code does include registered partnership, it explicitly prohibits adoption to a person in a registered partnership. The rest in concerned mainly with property rights.

The civil code regulation effective since 1 January 2014 is a result of eleven years of work of the recodification committee of the Ministry of Justice. Together with the Commercial Corporations Act and the Private International Law Act it constitutes a complete recodification of private law in the Czech Republic. It brings new and modern regulation of relations governed by civil law, with emphasis on personality rights, free will / more choice when writing a will or unified regulation of obligation laws.

Case law 

Theoretically, case law is not defined as a source of law in the Czech Republic. Despite that, the decisions of courts, namely supreme courts and the Constitutional Court, have a significant influence over the Czech legal system since 1989. Findings of the Constitutional Court are considered a source of law, and are binding for general courts. If a lower court is to rule against "consistent adjudications" of the Supreme Court on the point of law, it must give detailed reasoning, and this can often be a reason for a successful appeal. This system is largely based on judiciary's own interpretation of the Constitution, arguing that it gives citizens predictability and fairness. The most significant judgements of both courts are published in the official Collection of Laws.

History 

In Czech lands, the process of formation of modern legislation dates back to the era of enlightened absolutism, when they were a core part of the Austrian Empire. Reforms of government were to a large extent the work of empress Maria Theresa and her son Joseph II, who participated in creating the first civil code of the country in 1787, called Josephinisches Gesetzbuch. This was a forbearer to the comprehensive codification of civil law in 1811, known as the Allgemeines bürgerliches Gesetzbuch (ABGB). ABGB was received in 1918 by Czechoslovakia, among other successor states, but only for Czech lands (Bohemia, Moravia and Austrian Silesia), while Slovakia kept the customary law of Hungary. Albeit updated many times, this Austrian law was kept in Czechoslovakia, along with the legal duality, until 1950, when the "Middle Civil Code" was promulgated, soon to be superseded by the civil code of 1964, which will be in force until the "New Civil Code", enacted in 2009, will enter in force in 2014.

Following in the tracks of their enlightenment predecessors, the Constitutio criminalis Josephina of 1707 and the Constitutio criminalis Theresiana of 1768, the most important Czechoslovakian criminal codes were enacted in 1950, 1961 and 2009.

The history of Czechoslovak constitutionality starts with the formation of independent Czechoslovakia out of the ruins of Austria-Hungary. In 1918, the Interim Constitution of Czechoslovakia has been enacted hastily, establishing the republic with its president and temporary parliament. The Czechoslovak Constitution of 1920 succeeded it, inspired by western democratic constitutions, and, controversially, postulating the Czechoslovak nation. This lasted over the First Republic and the second world war. In 1948, the so-called Ninth-of-May Constitution was enacted after the communist coup – preserving some democratic institutions (human rights, partial division of the three powers, independent judiciary), though the political reality of the country departed from it radically. The 1960 Constitution of Czechoslovakia, influenced by soviet constitutions, is often dubbed the "Socialist Constitution". It changed the name of the country to Czechoslovak Socialist Republic and defined socialist, rather than democratic, character of the state, and introduced the leading role of the Communist Party of Czechoslovakia. The 1960 constitution remained in force until 1992, although in 1968 it was substantially modified by the Constitutional Act on the Czechoslovak Federation – this transformed the unitary state into a federation of the Czech Socialist Republic and the Slovak Socialist Republic. Further radical modifications were enacted after the regime change of 1989, but they turned out to be short-lived, as in 1992 the Constitution of the Czech Republic has been promulgated after the division of Czechoslovakia, and entered into force in 1993.

Sources and further reading

Statutes in Czech

References

Literature 
 Karabec, Z., J. Vlach, S. Diblíková, and P. Zeman. Criminal Justice System in the Czech Republic. Prague: Institute of Criminology and Social Prevention, 2011. Print. Sources.

External links 
 National Labour Law Profile: The Czech Republic maintained by International Labour Organization
 Czech Laws in English (Zákony anglicky). – a collection of unofficial translations of Czech statutes (of varying quality) maintained by a professional translator
  Vyhledávání v zákonech – an official online collection of Czech states published by the Czech government

Law of the Czech Republic
Legal systems